The San Lorenzo de Roma Parish Church, also known as the Saint Lawrence, Deacon and Martyr Parish Church or simply, Balagtas Church is an 18th-century Baroque church located at Brgy. Longos, Balagtas, Bulacan, Philippines. The parish church, dedicated to Saint Lawrence, is under the jurisdiction of the Roman Catholic Diocese of Malolos.

History

Parish history
Balagtas, originally referred to as Caruya and later renamed to Bigaa by the mid-1600s, was accepted by the Augustinian Friars as a convent under the patronage of Saint Lawrence on May 12, 1596. Father Francisco de Campos and Father Andres de Cordoba were named priests of Balagtas the same year. The convent of Guiguinto was frequently annexed to the convent of Balagtas due to the former's poor economic status. Guiguinto was first annexed to Balagtas in 1607. By 1612, Balagtas was reported to be an independent with two visitas and 2,400 parishioners. Its catchment population decreased when one of its barrio-visita, Casay, separated to form a new parish. In 1639, Balagtas was declared a vicariate.

Architectural history
History tells that Balagtas had its first parochial structures made of light materials long before 1645, the year when it was reported to have sustained heavy damage from an earthquake. The convent of Balagtas must have experience financial instability since it was reported that it took the priests of Balagtas months before the structures can be repaired. The exact date of the construction of the present church cannot be pointed out clearly although some sources suggest that it was built a few years after 1805, the year when a church was reportedly built on Balagtas’ former town site, now known as Bigaang Matanda. Father Manuel Buceta, minister of Balagtas in 1738, 1751 and 1754 repaired the church and built a new convent. Another earthquake damaged the church in 1880. Between 1893 and 1898, the church and convent was repaired, the bell tower was erected under the supervision of Father Francisco Martin Giron. The church underwent series of renovations especially in the early 1960s.

Architecture
The most striking features of the church façade are the recessed arch dominating much of the front of the church and the absence of pilasters dividing the façade into several segments. Above and beside the arch are semicircular arch windows and a rose window that allow the entry of light to the choir loft inside. The two semicircular arch windows also act as niches holding figures of angels. The entire façade has been plastered with cement and was laid out with patterns mimicking the original stone wall. A concrete porte-cochere topped with onion-shaped finials was a later addition. Attached to the right of the church is a three-level octagonal bell tower.

References

External links

Spanish Colonial architecture in the Philippines
Roman Catholic churches in Bulacan
Baroque architecture in the Philippines
Churches in the Roman Catholic Diocese of Malolos